Eryk Lipiński (12 July 1908, Kraków - 27 September 1991) was a Polish artist. Satirist, caricaturist, essayist, he has designed posters, written plays and sketches for cabarets, as well as written books on related subjects.

Biography
Eryk Lipiński studied at the Warsaw Academy of Fine Arts from 1933 to 1939. His debut as a caricaturist was made few years earlier, in 1928, in magazine Pobudka. In 1935 he cofounded with  a satirical newspaper ; he was its chief editor for several years (1935–1937 and 1946–1953). During World War II he was one of the artists working with the Polish resistance, involved in production of false documents. He was arrested by the Nazis and imprisoned in the infamous Pawiak prison, in Mokotów prison and in the Auschwitz concentration camp.

After the war he joined the Polish United Workers' Party. In 1966 he organized the First . In 1978 he founded the Museum of Caricature in Warsaw and was its first director (it would be named after him in 2002). In 1980 he formed the Committee for the Preservation of Jewish Monuments in Poland. Active in preserving Polish Jewish culture; in 1987 he founded the Association of Polish Cartoonists (Stowarzyszenie Polskich Artystów Karykatury, SPAK).

One of the Polish Righteous Among the Nations (he received this title in 1991).

Honours 

 Commander's Cross of the Order of Polonia Restituta
 Officer's Cross of the Order of Polonia Restituta
 Gold Cross of Merit
 Medal of Victory and Freedom 1945
 Order of the Banner of Work
 Medal of the 10th Anniversary of People's Poland

Awards
 1948 - seven 1st prizes at the International Poster Exhibition in Vienna
 1964 - 1st prize for the best political poster of 1963
 1966 - Gold Pin (Złota Szpilka)
 1972 - Gold Pin with Laurel (Złota Szpilka z Wawrzynem)
 1981 - "Distinguished Artist of the Year 1980" of The Association of American Editorial Cartoonists

References

External links

ERYK LIPINSKI: Biography and Posters (gallery)
Eryk Lipiński: Satire and Humour
Founding Father on Display, Warsaw Voice, 9 July 2008
 Konkurs na rysunek satyryczny (Satirical picture competition) in memory of Eryk Lipiński; p. 4 contains a set of photos of Lipiński

1908 births
1991 deaths
Academy of Fine Arts in Warsaw alumni
Auschwitz concentration camp survivors
Burials at Powązki Cemetery
Commanders with Star of the Order of Polonia Restituta
Officers of the Order of Polonia Restituta
Artists from Kraków
Polish caricaturists
Polish resistance members of World War II
Polish satirists
Polish male writers

Polish Righteous Among the Nations
Polish Workers' Party politicians
Polish United Workers' Party members
Recipients of the Gold Cross of Merit (Poland)
Recipients of the Order of the Banner of Work
Writers from Kraków